The first season of the television comedy series Arrested Development aired between November 2, 2003 and June 6, 2004, on Fox in the United States. It consisted of 22 episodes, each running approximately 22 minutes in length. The first season was released on DVD in region 1 on October 19, 2004, in region 2 on March 21, 2005 and in region 4 on February 23, 2005. 

The show's storyline centers on the Bluth family, a formerly wealthy, habitually dysfunctional family and is presented in a continuous format, incorporating hand-held camera work, narration, archival photos and historical footage.

Cast 

 Jason Bateman as Michael Bluth
 Portia de Rossi as Lindsay Bluth-Fünke
 Will Arnett as Gob Bluth
 Michael Cera as George Michael Bluth
 Alia Shawkat as Maeby Fünke
 Tony Hale as Buster Bluth
 David Cross as Tobias Fünke
 Jeffrey Tambor as George and Oscar Bluth
 Jessica Walter as Lucille Bluth
 Ron Howard as Narrator (uncredited)

Episodes

The episode list below is ordered the same as on the season 1 DVD collection and not in their original broadcast order.

Reception

Critical reception 
In its first season, Arrested Development was met with widespread critical acclaim. On Rotten Tomatoes, the season has an approval rating of 100% with an average score of 10 out of 10 based on 24 reviews. The website's critical consensus reads, "Arrested Development puts an ambitiously complex, brilliantly fast-paced spin on dysfunctional family comedy, anchored by the efforts of a tremendously talented ensemble." On the review aggregator website Metacritic, the first season scored 89 out of 100, based on 24 reviews, indicating "Universal acclaim".

Awards and nominations
In 2004, the first season received seven Emmy Award nominations, and earned five wins:  Outstanding Comedy Series, Outstanding Directing and Writing for a Comedy Series for the pilot episode written by Mitchell Hurwitz and directed by brothers Anthony and Joe Russo, Outstanding Casting for a Comedy Series, and Outstanding Single-Camera Picture Editing for a Comedy Series. Jeffrey Tambor was nominated that year for Outstanding Supporting Actor in a Comedy Series.

Home media
The first season was released on DVD in region 1 on October 19, 2004, in region 2 on March 21, 2005 and in region 4 on February 23, 2005. Special features on the sets include the unaired and uncensored full-length pilot episode; commentary by creator Mitchell Hurwitz and cast members on the extended pilot, "Beef Consommé" and "Let Them Eat Cake"; deleted and extended scenes; "Breaking Ground: Behind the Scenes of Arrested Development" featurette; The Museum of Television & Radio: Q&A with Creator Mitchell Hurwitz and the cast of Arrested Development; TV Land – "Arrested Development: The Making of a Future Classic"; TV Land Awards — The Future Classic Award; Ron Howard Sneak Peek at Season 2; Arrested Development Promo – "Blind"; Easter Egg — Tobias Outtake.

References

External links 
 

 
2003 American television seasons
2004 American television seasons